Hrachya Harutyunyan (born February 14, 1961) is an Armenian actor and artistic director.

Biography
Hrachya Harutyunyan was born on February 14, 1961, in Yerevan.

Between 1979 and 1981, Harutyunyan studied at variety-circus department adjacent to ''Hayhamerg'' union, received a qualification of an artist in the original genre. In 1984, Harutyunyan graduated from the Yerevan State Institute of Theater and Cinema, faculty of Cinema. Starting from 1978, Harutyunyan works at Hrachya Ghaplanyan Drama Theatre in Yerevan, as an actor and artistic director.

Hrachya Harutyunyan is married to Syuzan Margaryan, singer and honored artist of Armenia. His daughter is Sirusho, who is also a singer and an honored artist of Armenia.

Works 
 “Beatrice”   
 “Cylinder”
 “Chao”
 “The Hostess”
 “The Wild Girl 20 years ago”
 “Death in Italian Style”
 “The Last Tango”
 “№ 707”
 “Love Has No Age”

TV-performances 
 “Kill The Man”
 “One Month in a Village”
 “In a Lift”
 “Impatient Lovers”
 “Me and She”
 “Yeghegnuhi”
 “The Victorious Woman”
 “The Thorn”
 “The Wooden Person”

Roles of Hrachya Harutyunyan at Theatre 
 Sergey “Story in Irkutsk”
 Carl “Jeanne d'Arc” J. Anouilh
 Irresponsible “Bus” S. Stratiyev
 Shade “The Shade” Schwarz
 Marc Antonio “Julius Caesar” Shakespeare
 The man “The Woman and The Man” N. Adalian
 Vince “Chao” M. Movazhon
 Jesus of Nazareth “Jesus of Nazareth and His Second Student” – P. Zeitunian
 Colonel “The Colonel Bird” Kh. Boychev
 Hamlet “Hamlet” Shakespeare
 John “The Voice of Silence or the Sixth Commandment” G. Khanjian, V. Chaldranian
 Philip Debney “Love Mess” H. Berger
 Jack Templeton “The Last Clown” B. Slade
 Judge “Parisian Verdict” P. Zeytunian
 Marvin “№707” N. Simon
 Colomb “Love Has No Age” Jean-Claude Islert

Films 
 Ara “White Dreams”
 Abegha “Old Gods”
 Godfather Petros “The Diary of a Cross-theft”
 Rshtuni “Abandoned people”
 Minister “Priestess”
 Arshak “Hostages”
 “Ter Voghormea” 
 Father “The Pathway of the Deers”

Awards 
 Honored Artist of Armenia (2006)
 State Award of Armenia (2012)

References

External links 

1961 births
Living people
Armenian male film actors
21st-century Armenian male actors
20th-century Armenian male actors
Male actors from Yerevan
Honored artists of Armenia